Langford Wellman Colley-Priest MM (September 1890 – 11/12 February 1928) was an Australian stretcher bearer during the First World War for the 8th Field Ambulance. He was awarded the Military Medal for conspicuous gallantry on the Western Front in 1917. He survived the war, but later drowned in 1928, and his body is believed to have been eaten by a shark.

Early life
Colley-Priest was born in Glebe, New South Wales, in September 1890 to George and Rose Colley-Priest. Prior to his embarkation for Egypt and deployment on the Western Front he resided with his parents in Neutral Bay and worked as a warehouseman. Colley-Priest was an Anglican.

Service
Colley-Priest enlisted in the 8th Field Ambulance, part of the 8th Infantry Brigade of the Australian Imperial Force, on 19 May 1915 and embarked aboard the HMAT Ascanius on 9 November, bound for Egypt and the Western Front. While serving, he was deployed at the Somme, Racquinghem, Polygon Wood, Messines, Villers-Bretonneux and Mont Saint-Quentin. In 1917, Colley-Priest was awarded the Military Medal. The recommendation for the award noted that he displayed:

Colley-Priest returned to Australian in 1919, was discharged on 3 August and awarded the 1914–15 Star, British War Medal and Victory Medal. for his war service. He later wrote the official history of his unit. Notable for its first-hand accounts of the front from the perspective of medical staff, he sold his war diary to the State Library of New South Wales in 1919 as part of their European War Collecting Project.

Death
Colley-Priest went swimming on either 11 or 12 February 1928, at Balmoral Beach, Sydney and was reported as missing on 13 February. On 14 February, a search team comprising the Balmoral local police and the New South Wales Water police were unable to find any signs of Colley-Priest. After the police search, a man observed a floating body in the distance and alerted the police to its presence. However, as the police approached the body a "huge object heaved out of the sea, grabbed the body, and disappeared." Newspapers at the time suggested suicide and that the body had been eaten by a shark. On 27 February, an arm washed up on the beach near Dobroyd Point and was assumed to be Colley-Priest's. A suitcase with his clothes and a note stating "Colley-Priest gone mad" were found on Balmoral Wharf. Members of the Mosman and water police retrieved a portion of a shirt believed to have been worn by Colley-Priest.

References

External links
 State Library of New South Wales – catalogue record
 Transcription of war diary
 Australian War Memorial – record
 AWM Award
 Return to Gallipoli: walking the battlefields of the Great War
 Mosman-Neutral Bay Rifle Club Roll of Honour

1890 births
1928 deaths
Australian Anglicans
Australian military personnel of World War I
Australian Army soldiers
Australian recipients of the Military Medal
People declared dead in absentia
People who died at sea
Military personnel from New South Wales
People from the Inner West (Sydney)
Shark attack victims